Robert Dalziel may refer to:
Bobby Dalziel (active 1948–1956), Scottish footballer
Robert Dalzell (died 1758), known to be commonly misspelled as Dalziel

See also
Robert Dalzell (disambiguation), others similarly named